Wang Yueren (born June 21, 1991 in Harbin, Heilongjiang) is a Chinese former competitive figure skater. She is the 2008 Chinese bronze medalist. She made her international debut at the 2007 Cup of China, where she placed 12th. At the 2008 Four Continents Championships, she was the highest placing Chinese lady.

Competitive highlights

References

External links
 Tracings.net profile

1991 births
Living people
Chinese female single skaters
Figure skaters from Harbin
Competitors at the 2009 Winter Universiade